Sar Korukan (also Romanized as Sar Korūkān) is a village in Mosaferabad Rural District, Rudkhaneh District, Rudan County, Hormozgan Province, Iran. At the 2006 census, its population was 70, in 13 families.

References 

Populated places in Rudan County